Milton and Tamar Maltz Performing Arts Center at Temple–Tifereth Israel is a 1200-seat historic arts and religious venue on the campus of Case Western Reserve University located on the Hough and University Circle border at Silver Park in Cleveland, Ohio.

The converted synagogue serves as the main performance venue of the Case Western Reserve music department and holds campus special events. Silver Hall is still used by the local Jewish congregation for yearly religious and special events.

In 2021, a Phase 2 construction project was completed, which added additional performing arts spaces to the Temple. Phase 2 consists of two theaters, scenic and costume shops, classrooms, storage, and the offices of the CWRU Department of Theater, which manages operations of the additional space.

History
Completed in 1924, the temple served as the home synagogue for the Tifereth-Israel. A large W. W. Kimball pipe organ was built for the opening, with specifications designed by temple organist Carleton H. Bullis.

In 1963, a branch synagogue, Tifereth-Israel, was established in suburban Beachwood, which is now the main place of worship. The congregation now known as The Temple - Tifereth Israel  still owns the University Circle building, whose Silver Sanctuary, named for longtime rabbi, Abba Hillel Silver, is still used on the High Holy Days as well as for life cycle events and meetings.

In Mar 2010, Case Western Reserve University and the Temple Tifereth-Israel announced a historic partnership to create the Milton and Tamar Maltz Performing Arts Center, which was led by a donation of $12 million from the Maltz Family Foundation of the Jewish Community Federation of Cleveland. The university estimates that the total renovation of the building will require $25.6 million, with an additional $7 million needed for construction of a pedestrian bridge/walkway to connect the building to the university campus.  Renovations and conversions were completed in 2015. The multi-phased project, carried out by architectural firm DLR Group, allowed the sanctuary to accommodate music performances, lectures, as well as a place of worship and expanded the facility for the university’s theater and dance departments.

Temple Museum of Religious Art
The Temple at University Circle is one of three gallery locations for the Temple Museum of Religious Art, operated by Temple-Tifereth Israel.   Other locations include the Temple-Tifereth Israel Gallery at the Maltz Museum of Jewish Heritage and Temple Tifereth-Israel in Beachwood.  The museum was founded in 1950 by Rabbi Abba Hillel Silver as part of the 100th anniversary celebration for The Temple-Tifereth Israel.

On August 30, 1974, The Temple was added to the National Register of Historic Places.  The Temple was designed by architect Charles R. Greco.

The Temple possesses three notable stained glass windows by Arthur Szyk.  They depict Gideon, Samson and Judah Maccabee.

References

External links

 Cleveland Jewish History: History of The Temple
 Temple Museum of Religious Art
 CSU Center for Sacred Landmarks: The Temple (Temple Tifereth Israel)
 Temple-Tifereth Israel - current congregation site

Religious buildings and structures in Cleveland
Jews and Judaism in Cleveland
Reform synagogues in Ohio
Museums in Cleveland
University Circle
Art museums and galleries in Ohio
Ethnic museums in Ohio
Jewish museums in the United States
Case Western Reserve University
National Register of Historic Places in Cleveland, Ohio
Synagogues on the National Register of Historic Places in Ohio
Synagogues completed in 1924
1924 establishments in Ohio
Museums established in 1950
Byzantine Revival architecture in Ohio
Byzantine Revival synagogues